Walsall Leather Museum is located in Walsall, in the West Midlands in England, and was opened in 1988, in a Victorian factory building renovated by Walsall Council. It tells the story of the leather trade in Walsall, charting the town's rise from a small market town into an international saddle-making centre.

The Industry 
In 1900, at the peak of the industry, approximately 10,000 people were employed locally in preparing leather, and making saddles, horse bridles and related leather items. It is estimated that there are still at least 40 manufacturers of saddles and bridles in the town including a number of makers of bags and light leathergoods, including Royal Warrant holders.

Exhibitions 
Exhibits in the museum include a range of Walsall-made leathergoods, from saddles to gloves, bags, shoes, and leather fashion accessories. A 'contemporary design' section in the museum showcases the work of designers working with leather today. Leather crafts traditional to Walsall are demonstrated within the museum's workshops by a team of experienced skilled craftsmen and women.

The museum also houses a research library of specialist works on the subject of the leather craft and industry. 
There is a seasonal events programme featuring craft workshops for children and adults as well as family events.

See also 
Igualada Leather Museum
German Leather Museum
Whitehouse Cox (British company)

Bibliography

External links 

 

Buildings and structures in Walsall
Leather museums
Museums in the West Midlands (county)
Industry museums in England
Fashion museums in the United Kingdom
Museums established in 1988
1988 establishments in England